Greg Irwin is an American singer, songwriter, narrator, voice actor and master of ceremonies from Eau Claire, Wisconsin, United States. Called "The Messenger of Japanese Folk Songs" he translated and wrote English lyrics for over 100 Japanese Doyo songs. He was the voice for You've Got Mail for NTT Docomo cell phones in Japan and was the inflight voice for All Nippon Airways, and Starlux Airlines from Taiwan. He is a bilingual master of ceremonies for events and wedding receptions in Japan.

History  
Born and raised in Wisconsin he moved to Tokyo, Japan after attending the University of Wisconsin Eau Claire and the University of Minnesota. After a homestay in Japan, Greg worked at Tokyo Disneyland before returning and enrolling in the University of Hawaii, Japanese Language Department. In Honolulu he worked as a DJ at KOHO-FM. He was enchanted by Japanese Doyo after his return to Japan for a second time, and became active in Japanese entertainment .

In 2002, he received the Japan Children's Music Association's "Children's Music Culture Award". He has also received awards such as the Japan Music Association "Children's Division Grand Prix" and the John Lennon Songwriting Contest "R & B Award".
Dubbed as the "Messenger of Japanese Doyo", he translated various Japanese traditional songs into English. His hobbies include swimming, traveling, listening to music and musicals. He is highly skilled as a bilingual Master of Ceremonies.

Television Appearance 
 International TV School YU CAN DO IT!
 The Pride of NHK
 Ongaku no Kaze (Wind of Music) Music TV Programme
 Let's Meet on Park Street
 Comedian in Edo
 Sanka Getsukan Eikaiwa (THREE Months English conversation) English TV Programme
 Japanese Countryside Culture Hometown Flight
 SMAP x SMAP
 A Concert Without a Title
 Takeshi's Everyone is a Picasso
 Nama Hama Taikoku Night TV Kanagawa

TV Animation  
 Flash Night Raid (2010, Victor Bulwer-Lytton)
 Detective Conan (2019, Newscaster)

Theatrical animation 
 Here is Katsushika-ku Kameari Park Front Office THE MOVIE (1999, Caster)
 Detective Conan Inter-dimensional Sniper (2014, Fujinami Hiroaki)

Game  
 Street Fighter ZERO 3 (Narrator in 1998)

Radio 
 Radio vitamin (2008)

Commercials 
 NTT DoCoMo
 House Foods
 Fuji Film
 Mentos

Discography

Singles  
 Japanese Songs To Sing in English
 Shoshoji
 SING ENGLISH!
 New Hitachi Ondo
 Children's Songs of the World Japan Crown

Albums 
 Happy Child Japan Victor
 Gentle Heart -Songs of Japan-
 Blue Eyes-Beautiful Songs of Japan-Victor Entertainment
 SING ENGLISH!-Master English in 20 Songs-

Works 
 A Duck Named Alex
 Best Loved Songs of the Season 1 & !! The Japan Times

Bibliography 

 Article on Greg Irwin from 'Behind the Voice Actors' website

Living people
American male voice actors
American male video game actors
Male actors from Wisconsin
20th-century American male actors
21st-century American male actors
University of Hawaiʻi at Mānoa alumni
Male actors from Hawaii
Year of birth missing (living people)